Neopachygaster meromelaena, the silver-strips black, is a European species of soldier fly.

Distribution
Europe.

References

Stratiomyidae
Diptera of Europe
Insects described in 1841
Taxa named by Léon Jean Marie Dufour